Ogrodniki  is a village in the administrative district of Gmina Knyszyn, within Mońki County, Podlaskie Voivodeship, in north-eastern Poland.

According to the 1921 census, the village was inhabited by 65 people, among whom 49 were Roman Catholic, 14 Orthodox, 1 Evangelical, and 1 Mosaic. At the same time, 51 inhabitants declared Polish nationality, 14 Belarusian. There were 10 residential buildings in the village.

References

Villages in Mońki County